Teshome Getu (born 7 February 1983 in Ethiopia) is an Ethiopian football midfielder. He currently plays for EEPCO.

International career
Getu is a member of the Ethiopia national football team and he was a member of the Ethiopia squad at the 2001 FIFA World Youth Cup.

Honors
Ethiopian Premier League: 3
2003–04, 2004–05, 2005–06

Ethiopian Super Cup: 2
2005, 2006

References
Teshome Getu was featured with his family in the book Material World: A Global Family Portrait, which was written by Peter Menzel, Charles C. Mann, and Paul Kennedy.

External links

1983 births
Living people
Ethiopian footballers
Ethiopia international footballers
Association football midfielders